This is a list of urban agglomerations and cities (those not included in the urban agglomerations), with a population above 100,000 as per the 2011 census in the Indian state of West Bengal:

Urban agglomeration
In the census of India 2011, an urban agglomeration has been defined as follows:

"An urban agglomeration is a continuous urban spread constituting a town and its adjoining outgrowths (OGs), or two or more physically contiguous towns together with or without outgrowths of such towns. An Urban Agglomeration must consist of at least a statutory town and its total population (i.e. all the constituents put together) should not be less than 20,000 as per the 2001 Census. In varying local conditions, there were similar other combinations which have been treated as urban agglomerations satisfying the basic condition of contiguity."

Constituents of urban agglomerations in West Bengal
The constituents of urban agglomerations in West Bengal, with a population of 1 lakh or above, are noted below:

 Kolkata Urban Agglomeration includes :  Kolkata district: Kolkata (M Corp.), Nadia district: Kalyani (M), Gayespur (M), North 24 Parganas district: Raigachhi (CT), Barasat (M), Madhyamgram (M), Kanchrapara (M),  Nanna (OG), Chakla (OG), Srotribati (OG), Jetia (CT), Halisahar (M), Balibhara (CT), Naihati (M), Noapara (P) (CT), Babanpur (CT), Teghari (CT), Bhatpara (M), Panpur (OG), Kaugachhi (CT), Garshyamnagar (CT), Garulia (M), Ichhapur Defence Estate (CT), North Barrackpur (M), Barrackpur Cantonment (CB), Barrackpur (M), Jafarpur (CT), Ruiya (CT), Titagarh (M), Khardaha (M), Bandipur (CT), Panihati (M), Muragachha (CT), New Barrackpur (M), Chandpur (CT), Talbandha (CT), Patulia (CT), Kamarhati (M), Baranagar (M), South Dum Dum (M), North Dum Dum (M), Dum Dum (M), Rajarhat-Gopalpur (M) [now merged with Bidhannagar (M Corp.)], Bidhannagar (M Corp.), Nabadiganta Industrial Township Authority (Salt Lake Sector V) (M), West Bengal Housing Infrastructure Development Corp (New Town) (M),  Hooghly district: Dankuni (M Corp) Bansberia (M), Hugli-Chinsurah (M), Bara Khejuria (OG), Shankhanagar (CT),  Amodghata (CT),  Chak Banshberia (CT), Naldanga (CT), Kodalia (CT), Kulihanda (CT), Simla (CT), Dharmapur (CT), Bhadreswar (M), Champdani (M), Chandannagar (M Corp.), Baidyabati (M), Serampore (M), Rishra (M), Rishra (CT), Bamunari (CT), Dakshin Rajyadharpur (CT), Nabagram Colony (CT), Konnagar (M), Uttarpara Kotrung (M), Raghunathpur (PS-Dankuni) (CT), Kanaipur (CT), Keota (CT), Howrah district: Bally (M) [Now merged with Howrah (M Corp.)], Howrah (M Corp.), Bally (CT), Jagadishpur (CT), Chamrail (CT), Eksara (CT), Chakapara (CT), Khalia (CT), Bankra (CT), Nibra (CT), Mahiari (CT), Bipra Noapara (CT), Ankurhati (CT), Kantlia (CT), Salap (CT), Tentulkuli (CT), 83 Argari (CT), Andul (CT), Ramchandrapur (CT), Jhorhat (CT), Hatgachha (CT), Dhuilya (CT), Panchpara (CT), Podara (CT), Banupur (CT), Sankrail (CT), Manikpur (CT), Sarenga (CT), Raghudebbati (CT), Nalpur (CT), Uluberia (M), Chak Srikrishna (OG), Khalisani (CT), Uttar Pirpur (CT), Balarampota (CT), Santoshpur (CT), Domjur (CT), Dakshin Jhapardaha (CT), Makardaha (CT), Khantora (CT), Bhandardaha (CT), Kamranga (CT), Jaypur Bil (CT), South 24 Parganas district: Joka (CT), Chata Kalikapur (CT), Ganye Gangadharpur (CT), Rameswarpur (CT), Asuti (CT), Hanspukuria (CT), Kalua (CT), Ramchandrapur (CT), Samali (CT), Maheshtala (M), Uttar Raypur (CT), Balarampur (CT), Buita (CT), Benjanhari Acharial (CT), Abhirampur (CT), Nischintapur (CT), Birlapur (CT), Chak Kashipur (CT), Chak Alampur (CT), Bowali (CT), Dakshin Raypur (CT), Poali (CT), Pujali (M), Budge Budge (M), Daulatpur (CT), Bhasa (CT), Bishnupur (CT), Kanyanagar (CT), Nahazari (CT), Nadabhanga (CT), Kanganbaria (CT), Bora Gagangohalia (CT), Chanddandaha (CT), Barkalikapur (CT), Patharberia (CT), Ramkrishnapur (CT), Amtala (CT), Kriparampur (CT), Chak Enayetnagar (CT), Maricha (CT), Bhangar Raghunathpur (CT), Gobindapur (CT), Radhanagar (CT), Danga (CT), Ramchandrapur (CT), Bidyadharpur (CT), Kalikapur (CT), Chak Baria (CT), Sahebpur (CT), Rajpur Sonarpur (M), Petua (CT), Garia (CT), Panchghara (CT), Mallikpur (CT), Hariharpur (CT), Champahati (CT), Solgohalia (CT), Naridana (CT), Salipur (CT), Khodar Bazar (CT), Komarhat (CT), Baruipur (M), Raynagar (CT), Kalikapur Barasat (CT), Baharu (CT), Uttarparanij (CT), Alipur (CT), Uttar Durgapur (CT), Jaynagar Majilpur (M).

 Asansol Urban Agglomeration includes: Asansol (M Corp.), Salanpur-Rupnarayanpur (CT), Bhanowara (CT), Charanpur (OG), Jemari (J.K. Nagar Township) (CT), Sahebganj (CT), Egara (CT), Amkula (CT), Murgathaul (CT), Raghunathchak (CT), Ballavpur (CT), Majiara (CT), Domohani (CT), Topsi (CT), Baktarnagar (CT).

 Siliguri Jalpaiguri Urban Agglomeration includes: Darjeeling district: Siliguri (M Corp.), Kalkut/Champasari (CT), Shibmandir (CT), Bagdogra (CT), Jalpaiguri district: Dabgram (CT), Jalpaiguri (M)

 Durgapur Urban Agglomeration includes: Durgapur (M Corp.), Bamunara (CT), Arra (CT).

 Bardhaman Urban Agglomeration includes: Bardhaman (M), Goda (CT), Bahir Sarbamangala (CT), Nari (CT).

 Malda Urban Agglomeration includes: English Bazar (M), Old Malda (M), Chhatianmor (CT), Bagbari (CT), Sahapur (CT).

 Baharampur Urban Agglomeration includes: Baharampur (M), Kasimbazar (CT), Goaljan (CT), Gora Bazar (CT), Gopjan (CT), Sibdanga Badarpur (CT), Chaltia (CT), Haridasmati (CT), Ajodhya Nagar  (CT), Banjetia (CT).

 Habra Urban Agglomeration includes: Habra (M), Ashoknagar Kalyangarh (M), Bara Bamonia (CT), Guma (CT), Anarbaria (CT), Khorddabamonia (CT).

 Kharagpur Urban Agglomeration includes: Kharagpur (M), Kharagpur Rly. Settlement (CT), Kalaikunda (CT).

 Santipur Urban Agglomeration includes:  Santipur (M), Taherpur (NA), Taherpur (OG), Barasat (OG), Bhaduri (OG), Mahishdanga (OG), Phulia (CT), Patuli (CT), Badkulla (CT), Ghoralia (CT), Beharia (CT), Gangi (CT).

 Dankuni Urban Agglomeration includes: Dankuni (M), Purbba Tajpur (CT), Kharsarai (CT), Begampur (CT), Chikrand (CT), Pairagachha (CT), Barijhati (CT), Garalgachha (CT), Krishnapur (CT), Baruipara (CT), Borai (CT), Nawapara (CT), Basai (CT), Gangadharpur (CT),  Manirampur, Janai (CT), Kapashanria (CT), Jaykrishnapur (CT), Tisa (CT), Baksa (CT), Panchghara (CT), Naiti (CT).

 Dhulian Urban Agglomeration includes: Dhulian (M), Anup Nagar (CT), Dhusaripara (CT), Uttar Mahammadpur (CT), Kankuria (CT), Chachanda (CT), Basudebpur (CT), Kohetpur (CT), Jaykrishnapur (CT), Jafrabad (CT).

 Ranaghat Urban Agglomeration includes: Ranaghat (M), Birnagar (M), Cooper's Camp (NA), Magurkhali (OG), Ranaghat (CT), Hijuli (CT), Aistala (CT), Satigachha (CT), Nasra (CT), Panpara (CT), Raghabpur (CT), Kamgachhi (CT), Anulia (CT), Halalpur Krishnapur (CT).

 Raiganj Urban Agglomeration includes: Raiganj (M), Kasba (CT), Nachhratpur Katabari (CT).

 Krishnanagar Urban Agglomeration includes: Krishnanagar (M), Baruihuda (CT), Paschim Bhatjangla (CT), Sonda (CT).

 Nabadwip Urban Agglomeration includes: Nabadwip (M), Char Maijdia (CT), Char Brahmanagar (CT), Bablari Dewanganj (CT), Tiorkhali (CT), Gadigachha (CT), Majdia (CT).

 Jalpaiguri Urban Agglomeration includes: Jalpaiguri (M), Mainaguri (M), Domohani (CT), Belakoba (CT), Paharpur (CT), Kranti (CT), Raninagar (CT), Mohitnagar (CT), Kharia (CT), Aurobindo (OG).

 Balurghat Urban Agglomeration includes: Balurghat (M), Baidyanathpara (OG), Chak Bhrigu (CT), Dakra (CT).

 Basirhat Urban Agglomeration includes: Basirhat (M), Uttar Bagundi (CT), Dandirhat (CT), Raghunathpur (CT).

 Chakdaha Urban Agglomeration includes:  Chakdaha (M), Parbbatipur (CT), Gopalpur (CT), Belgharia (CT), Punglia (CT), Lalpur (CT).

 Darjeeling Urban Agglomeration includes: Darjeeling (M), Chongtong Tea Garden (CT), Singtam Tea Garden (CT).

 Alipurduar Urban Agglomeration includes: Alipurduar (M), Sobhaganj. (CT), Alipurduar Rly.Jnc. (CT), Chechakhata (CT), Paschim Jitpur (CT), Bholar Dabri (CT), Birpara (CT).

 Purulia Urban Agglomeration includes: Purulia (M), Raghabpur (CT).

 Jangipur Urban Agglomeration includes: Jangipur (M), Charka (CT), Dafarpur (CT), Ramnagar (CT).

 Cooch Behar Urban Agglomeration includes: Cooch Behar (M), Kharimala Khagrabari (CT), Guriahati (CT).

Abbreviations: M Corp. = Municipal Corporation, M = Municipality, CT = Census Town, OG = Out Growth, NA = Notified Area, CB = Cantonment Board

Urban agglomeration constituents
Urban agglomerations constituents with a population above 100,000 as per the 2011 census are shown in the table below.

References

Cities and towns in West Bengal
Cities by population